Alari Lell (born 10 June 1976) is a retired football (soccer) defender from Estonia. He played for several clubs in his native country, including FC Flora Tallinn, JK Tervis Pärnu, JK Viljandi Tulevik and FC Kuressaare.

International career
Lell earned his first official cap for the Estonia national football team on 25 March 1995, when Estonia played Italy in a qualifier for Euro 1996. He obtained a total number of six caps.

References
weltfussball

1976 births
Living people
Estonian footballers
Estonia international footballers
Association football defenders
Viljandi JK Tulevik players
FC Flora players
FC Kuressaare players
JK Tervis Pärnu players